Uma Tarde na Fruteira (Portuguese for "An Evening at the Fruit Shop") is the fourth and final studio album by the Brazilian musician Jupiter Apple, released in 2007 by Spanish label Elefant Records. Distancing itself from its predecessors Plastic Soda and Hisscivilization, it is mostly sung in Portuguese and returns to the more "accessible" psychedelia of his 1997 debut A Sétima Efervescência, in sonority terms.

The album was re-issued in Brazil by Monstro Discos in 2008, with a different cover art and track list; while the original Elefant version is more of a compilation with some previously unreleased tracks in-between, Monstro's version contains only new tracks.

Music videos were made for the tracks "A Marchinha Psicótica de Dr. Soup" and "Mademoiselle Marchand".

"Beatle George" is a tribute to George Harrison.

A double-vinyl deluxe edition of Uma Tarde na Fruteira, also by Monstro Discos, was released in January 2019.

Covers and appearances in other media
Rogério Skylab covered "Na Casa de Mamãe" for his 2009 album Skygirls, and "A Marchinha Psicótica de Dr. Soup" for his 2019 album Crítica da Faculdade do Cu. Early versions of "A Marchinha Psicótica de Dr. Soup" and "As Mesmas Coisas" appeared in the soundtrack of the 2006 animated film Wood & Stock: Sexo, Orégano e Rock'n'Roll.

Critical reception
Uma Tarde na Fruteira has received positive reviews upon its release. Stewart Mason of AllMusic gave it 3.5 out of 5 stars, describing it as a "double-album-length potted history/reconstruction of the most vibrant era in Brazilian music – roughly from the birth of bossa nova through the petering out of Tropicália, or the late '50s through the early '70s". He praised the album as being "richly melodic and instantly memorable". Bruno Yutaka Saito of Folha de S.Paulo also spoke favorably of the album, comparing its "eclectic" sonority to the works of Caetano Veloso, Roberto Carlos and Stereolab.

Writing for his website Trabalho Sujo in 2009, Alexandre Matias included the album in his list of the 50 Greatest Albums of 2008, in 24th place.

La Cumbuca included Uma Tarde na Fruteira in 198th place in its list of the Top 200 Brazilian Albums of the 2000s.

Track listing

Elefant Records version (2007)

Monstro Discos version (2008)

Personnel
 Jupiter Apple – vocals, bass guitar, electric guitar, classical guitar, electric organ, piano, drums, kazoo, percussion
 Thalita Freitas – backing vocals, percussion
 Cuca Medina – backing vocals, synth, flute
 Rodrigo Souto – drums, percussion
 Astronauta Pinguim – electric organ, Moog
 Bibiana Graeff – accordion, synth, marimba
 Luciano Bolobang – drums, percussion
 Clayton – drums
 Gustavo Dreher – flute
 Lúcio Vassaratt – sitar
 Ray-Z – electric guitar
 Zé do Trumpett – trumpet
 Thomas Dreher – production
 Gregorio Soria – cover art (2007 version)

References

2007 albums